George Fox is the debut album by Canadian country music artist George Fox. It was released by Warner Music Canada in 1988. The album peaked at number 16 on the RPM Country Albums chart and was certified gold by the CRIA.

Track listing
"Angelina" – 3:25
"RBJ" – 4:13
"Goldmine" – 3:58
"State Side" – 3:22
"Lovesick Blues" – 2:53
"Hey Johnny" – 3:52
"I've Been Everywhere" – 3:51
"Long Distance" – 3:48
"Heartwreck" – 3:44
"Life of the Party" – 4:03

Chart performance

References

External links
[ George Fox] at Allmusic

1988 debut albums
George Fox albums